The following is a partial list of Bays of South Africa.

List of Bays of South Africa

See also 
 List of estuaries of South Africa
 List of rivers of South Africa
 List of lakes of South Africa
 List of dams in South Africa
 List of lagoons of South Africa
 List of islands of South Africa

References

 
Bays
South Africa